Alair Assembly constituency is a constituency of the Telangana Legislative Assembly, India. It is one of 12 constituencies in the Yadadri Bhuvanagiri district. It is part of Bhongir Lok Sabha constituency.

Gongidi Sunitha Reddy of Telangana Rashtra Samithi is representing the constituency for the second time.

Mandals
The Assembly Constituency presently comprises the following Mandals:

Members of Legislative Assembly

Election results

Telangana Legislative Assembly election, 2018

Telangana Legislative Assembly election, 2014

See also
 Alair
 List of constituencies of Telangana Legislative Assembly

References

Assembly constituencies of Telangana
Assembly constituencies of Nalgonda district